The following highways are numbered 721:

Costa Rica
 National Route 721

United States
  Florida State Road 721 (former)
 Georgia State Route 721 (former)
 Nevada State Route 721 (former)
 New Jersey:
  County Route 721 (Camden County, New Jersey)
  County Route 721 (Cumberland County, New Jersey)
  County Route 721 (Hudson County, New Jersey)
  Ohio State Route 721
  Puerto Rico Highway 721
 Virginia State Route 721 (1930-1933) (former)